Fossa navicularis is an alternate name for two different boat-shaped depressions: 
 fossa of vestibule of vagina
 navicular fossa of male urethra